2324 Janice, provisional designation , is a dark background asteroid from the outer regions of the asteroid belt, approximately  in diameter. It was discovered on 7 November 1978, by American astronomers Eleanor Helin and Schelte Bus at the Palomar Observatory in California. The asteroid was named for Janice Cline at Caltech. The presumably C-type asteroid has a rotation period of 23.2 hours.

Orbit and classification 

Based on osculating Keplerian orbital elements, Janice is located in the region of the Themis family, a very large family of carbonaceous asteroids, named after 24 Themis.

When applying the hierarchical clustering method to its proper orbital elements, the object is both a non-family asteroid of the main belt's background population (according to Nesvorný), as well as a core member of the Themis family (according to Milani and Knežević).

It orbits the Sun in the outer main-belt at a distance of 2.5–3.6 AU once every 5 years and 5 months (1,977 days; semi-major axis of 3.08 AU). Its orbit has an eccentricity of 0.18 and an inclination of 0° with respect to the ecliptic.

Physical characteristics 

Janice is a presumed carbonaceous C-type asteroid which is the overall spectral type of members of the Themis family.

Rotation period 

In October 2010, a rotational lightcurve of Janice was obtained from photometric observations by Gordon Gartrelle at the University of North Dakota Observatory in Grand Forks . Lightcurve analysis gave a tentative rotation period of 23.2 hours with a brightness amplitude of 0.19 magnitude. As of 2018, no secure period has been obtained.

Diameter and albedo 

According to the surveys carried out by the Japanese Akari satellite and the NEOWISE mission of NASA's Wide-field Infrared Survey Explorer, Janice measures between 24.33 and 31.19 kilometers in diameter and its surface has an albedo between 0.038 and 0.093.

The Collaborative Asteroid Lightcurve Link assumes an albedo of 0.08 and calculates a diameter of 23.55 kilometers based on an absolute magnitude of 11.5.

Naming 

This minor planet was named after Janice Cline, who for many years has encouraged astrometric studies of minor planets at Caltech. The official naming citation was published by the Minor Planet Center on 1 March 1981.

References

External links 
 Asteroid Lightcurve Database (LCDB), query form (info )
 Dictionary of Minor Planet Names, Google books
 Asteroids and comets rotation curves, CdR – Observatoire de Genève, Raoul Behrend
 Discovery Circumstances: Numbered Minor Planets (1)-(5000) – Minor Planet Center
 
 

002324
Discoveries by Eleanor F. Helin
Discoveries by Schelte J. Bus
Named minor planets
19781107